Air draft (or air draught) is the distance from the surface of the water to the highest point on a vessel. This is similar to the "deep draft" of a vessel which is measured from the surface of the water to the deepest part of the hull below the surface, but air draft is expressed as a height, not a depth.

Clearance below 
The vessel's "clearance" is the distance in excess of the air draft which allows a vessel to pass safely under a bridge or obstacle such as power lines, etc.  A bridge's "clearance below" is most often noted on charts as measured from the surface of the water to the under side of the bridge at the chart datum Mean High Water (MHW), a less restrictive clearance than Mean Higher High Water (MHHW). 

In 2014, the United States Coast Guard reported that 1.2% of the collisions it investigated in the recent past were due to vessels attempting to pass underneath structures with insufficient clearance.

Examples

New vessels are rarely built not clearing , a height which accommodates all but the largest cruise and container ships.

The Suez Canal Bridge has a  clearance over the canal.

See also 
 Structural clearance
 Structure gauge
 Tower Bridge
 Cargo ship size categories 
Chart datum

References

Ship measurements